The tornesel, tornesol, or  was a silver coin of Europe in the Late Middle Ages and the early modern era. Marco Polo referred to the tornesel in recounts of his travels to East Asia when describing the currencies of the Yuan Empire. His descriptions were based on the conversion of 1 bezant = 20 groats =  tornesel.

The  was a subunit of the Neapolitan, Sicilian, and Two Sicilies ducats.

References

Medieval Italy
Medieval currencies
Coins of Italy
Silver coins